Smrček is a municipality and village in Chrudim District in the Pardubice Region of the Czech Republic. It has about 100 inhabitants.

Administrative parts
The hamlet of Smrček-Na Sádkách is an administrative part of Smrček.

References

External links

Villages in Chrudim District